Lina Esco  is an American actress, producer, director and activist. She gained recognition in 2007 for portraying Jimmy Smits' character's daughter in the CBS television drama Cane. Esco has also performed in films, including London (2005), Kingshighway (2010), LOL (2012), and Free the Nipple. She is also known for portraying SWAT officer Christina "Chris" Alonso in S.W.A.T..

Career 

Esco was cast in her first television guest star role in 2006, as Angie Watson in series CSI: NY. In March, 2007 Esco joined the cast of the CBS drama Cane. In 2009, she guest starred in an episode of the Drop Dead Diva series with Paula Abdul. Esco played a lingerie model who had been fired for going public about her breast cancer survival story.

In February 2011, Esco was slated to join the cast of Fox's pilot Exit Strategy. Described as a high octane procedural set in the world of CIA agents who are sent in to "fix" operations gone bad. The cast included Ethan Hawke, Megan Dodds and with Antoine Fuqua directing. Esco was to play Mia, an MIT graduate and computer expert from South Boston. In 2014, Esco was cast in Ryan Murphy's pilot for HBO alongside Michelle Monaghan, Wes Bentley, Scott Speedman, and Jennifer Jason Leigh.

Esco's film debut was in 2005 with London. She is a supporting character in the 2012 comedy LOL.

Esco acted on "S.W.A.T." since its first season in 2017. She played Officer Christina "Chris" Alonso. Following the show's season five finale, Esco confirmed she was leaving the series to pursue other projects.

Producing and directing
In April 2010, Esco produced "My Friend is...", a public service announcement for the Academy Award-winning documentary The Cove alongside Oscar-winning producer Fisher Stevens joined forces with a number celebrities to bring awareness on the annual killing of dolphins in Taiji, Japan.

She directed "Kids Speak Out Against Dolphin Captivity", a 2012 public service announcement for The Cove. She directed Free the Nipple in a bid to circumvent female nipple censorship.

She directed and starred in Free the Nipple, which was released in select theaters, video on demand and on iTunes on December 12, 2014.

Other work 
Esco has been showcased in various commercial, music videos, magazines and publications.  In 2001, she was featured in the Sinéad O'Connor music video "Jealous". She appears briefly in Moby's music video for "Southside" featuring Gwen Stefani. She was also an extra for a series of Axe commercials one including with Nick Lachey for the "Clix" campaign in 2007. Esco also features in Halos's music video for "Amalgam" in 2010.

On January 12, 2011, it was reported that Lina would be showcased on the Louis Vuitton's jewelry collection for the Spring/Summer 2011. The campaign featured sixteen "It" girls from around the globe that included Alexandra Richards, Annabelle Dexter Jones, Mary Charteris, Alka Balbir, Mohini Geisweiller, DJette Clara 3000, Charlotte Lebon, Hailey Gates, Nathalie Love and Rinko Kikuchi.

On May 16, 2011, Esco was featured in Ketel One ad campaign "Gentlemen, This is Vodka." directed by Academy Award Nominee, David O. Russell.

Esco is in a 2013 NFL Women's Apparel Collection TV advertisement.

In 2017, Esco was featured on the Audience network's Midnight Snack on Fullscreen (What's Underneath), where the guests remove their clothing on camera while talking about their life.

Activism and philanthropy
Esco has supported many foundations and organizations throughout her career.

Esco has been very involved in two organizations. Dolphin Project, which has gained much support from many celebrities, is an organization led by Richard O'Barry  and aims to prevent dolphin slaughter and exploitation from occurring. On September 9, 2009, Esco held a private screening of The Cove in New York, alongside Russell Simmons and Fisher Stevens hosting the event to bring awareness on the film.

Esco may be best known for how involved she is in women's rights and the Free the Nipple campaign. The organization, as Esco states, is to promote sexual equality. Free the Nipple has attracted attention from numerous celebrities including Courtney Love and Miley Cyrus, who also has a song on the soundtrack of the Free the Nipple movie and continues to strongly support the organization.

In December 2018, Esco began campaigning for overturning Cyntoia Brown's murder conviction.

Esco has been outspoken in advocating against sexual harassment (including recounting her own by Harvey Weinstein) and publicly calls on US states to pass the Equal Rights Amendment that would enshrine gender equality in the US's Constitution.

Personal life
Esco is of Colombian descent. 
In 2017 she stated Harvey Weinstein had sexually harassed her, and that this had not been her only experience of sexual harassment. She has also spoken of being raped twice, while discussing the Me Too movement.

Filmography

Actress

Producer

References

External links
 

21st-century American actresses
Actresses from California
American child actresses
American film actresses
American people of Colombian descent
American television actresses
Hispanic and Latino American actresses
Latina and Hispanic feminists
Living people
Year of birth missing (living people) 

mr:जेनिफर ऍनिस्टन
ta:ஜெனிபர் அனிஸ்டன்
te:జెన్నిఫర్ అనిస్టన్